Western Suburbs was an electoral district of the Legislative Assembly in the Australian state of New South Wales in Sydney's inner western suburbs. It was created as a five-member electorate with the introduction of proportional representation in 1920, replacing Ashfield, Dulwich Hill, Leichhardt, Marrickville and Petersham. It was abolished in 1927 and replaced by Ashfield, Burwood, Croydon, Leichhardt and Marrickville.

Members for Western Suburbs

Election results

References

Former electoral districts of New South Wales
Constituencies established in 1920
Constituencies disestablished in 1927
1920 establishments in Australia
1927 disestablishments in Australia